Louis Guy Henri, Marquis de Valori, (November 11, 1692, in Menen – October 1774) was a French diplomat and aristocrat, who served as a general under Louis XV. He served as French ambassador at the courts of Frederick William I of Prussia and Frederick the Great.

List of works

References 

1692 births
1774 deaths
French diplomats
French marquesses